Sheikh Fayyaz Ud Din (born 15 December 1945) is a Pakistani politician who has been a member of the National Assembly of Pakistan, since August 2018. Previously he was a member of the National Assembly from June 2013 to May 2018.

Early life
He was born on 15 December 1945.

Political career

He was elected to the National Assembly of Pakistan as a candidate of Pakistan Muslim League (N) (PML-N) from Constituency NA-193 (Rahim Yar Khan-II) in 2013 Pakistani general election. He received 86,232 votes and defeated Mian Abdul Sattar.

He was re-elected to the National Assembly as a candidate of PML-N from Constituency NA-176 (Rahim Yar Khan-II) in 2018 Pakistani general election.

References

Living people
Pakistan Muslim League (N) politicians
Pakistani MNAs 2013–2018
1945 births
Pakistani MNAs 2018–2023